The 2018 California State Controller election was held on November 6, 2018, to elect the California State Controller. Incumbent Democratic Controller Betty Yee won re-election to a second term.

Candidates

Democratic Party

Declared

 Betty Yee, incumbent California State Controller

Republican Party

Declared

 Konstantinos Roditis, former Anaheim City Commissioner

Peace and Freedom Party

Declared

 Mary Lou Finley, retired public school worker

Primary election

Endorsements

Results

General election

Results
Yee won the election easily. Yee won by running up margins in heavily populated areas of the state. With 8,013,067 votes, Yee is the top vote earner in any California State Controller election.

References

External links
Official campaign websites
 Konstantinos Roditis (R) for Controller 
 Betty Yee (D) for Controller

State Controller
California State Controller elections
November 2018 events in the United States
California